She'll Follow You Anywhere, released in the United States as Passion Potion, is a 1971 British comedy film directed by David C. Rea and starring Kenneth Cope, Keith Barron and Richard Vernon. The screenplay concerns two chemists working in a lab of a big corporation who accidentally stumble across a love potion while working to create a new aftershave. The potion makes a man irresistible to any woman who smells it. However, they soon have problems remembering the formula, and keeping their discovery from their bosses and wives.

Plot summary
One day on the way home from work, Mike Carter finds himself propositioned by a woman on the train. He has been working on developing a new aftershave for his company along with his friend and colleague Alan Simpson. When Alan has a similar encounter with one of the women scientists at their office, they both realise it is linked to one of the numerous aftershave formulas they have developed creating a love potion which makes them irresistible to any woman.

The two men begin to test their formula with some success with the women of London. They persuade themselves that before they take it to their boss, the strict Andrew Coombes, they must give it extensive testing to make sure it does not contain any unsavoury side effects. Eager to keep their discovery secret from their wives, they begin to use an old army hut in Effingham for their trials, taking woman back there who they have picked up on the train.

When they begin to run out of the formula, they attempt to create some more using the original recipe. When this does not have any effect on woman, they realise that it must be due to a contaminated chemical that they put in the original potion. They try to locate it, but all issues of it have been destroyed. They begin doing tests to try to find the missing ingredient that will make their potion work.

Their wives are becoming increasingly suspicious about their strange behaviour, and their boss is demanding that they produce a new aftershave to a deadline. When they accidentally allow their boss to get hold of the secret, he too discovers its potency with his secretary. When the two men's wives arrive in London on a surprise shopping trip, the two men fear the game is up. They confess to their boss about the real nature of the potion, and the trials they have been conducting at Effingham. When the three men go to Effingham they discover the army are now demolishing the old huts, and the remaining potion is destroyed by accident. Coombes now threatens them with the sack, threatening to reveal to their wives what they have been doing, unless they can recreate the formula by endless testing of various chemicals to find the magic ingredient.

Cast
 Kenneth Cope ...Mike Carter
 Keith Barron ... Alan Simpson
 Richard Vernon ... Andrew Coombes
 Hilary Pritchard ...  Diane Simpson
 Philippa Gail ...  June Carter
 Penny Brahms ...  Miss Cawfield
 Sandra Bryant ...  Sue
 Anna Matisse ...  Erika
 Andrea Allan ...  Model with dog
 Josephine Baxter ...  Girl on train
 Mary Collinson ...  Janet
 Madeleine Collinson ...  Martha
 Linda Cunningham ...  Betty
 Valerie Stanton ...  Sally
 Me Me Lai ...  Bride
 Ray Barron ...  Groom
 Sheila Ruskin ...  Jackie
 David Garth ...  Manager
 Bob Todd ...  Car salesman
 William Job ...  Psychiatrist
 Michael Darbyshire ...  Doctor
 Joyce Windsor ...  Cleaner
 Ron Pember ...  Corporal
 Kenneth Keeling ...  Jackie's dad
 Hilary Mason ...  Jackie's mum
 Nancy Gabrielle ...  Perfume tester
 Beryl Cooke ...  Perfume tester
 Jennifer Watts ...  Bunny girl

References

External links

1971 films
1970s sex comedy films
British sex comedy films
1970s English-language films
1971 comedy films
1970s British films